Nizhniye Vyazovye (Qaramalı Taw) is an urban locality (an urban-type settlement) in Zelenodolsky District of the Republic of Tatarstan, Russia, located on the right bank of the Volga River (Kuybyshev Reservoir),  west of Zelenodolsk, the administrative center of the district. As of the 2010 Census, its population was 8,048.

History
It was founded no later than the first half of the 17th century and was granted urban-type settlement status in 1957.

Administrative and municipal status
Within the framework of administrative divisions, the urban-type settlement of Nizhniye Vyazovye is subordinated to Zelenodolsky District. As a municipal division, Nizhniye Vyazovye, together with eleven rural localities, is incorporated within Zelenodolsky Municipal District as Nizhniye Vyazovye Urban Settlement.

Economy and infrastructure
As of 1997, two major industrial enterprises in the settlement were a fur factory and a meat combine. The settlement serves as a railway station on the Moscow–Kazan line.

Demographics

In 1989, the population was ethnically mostly Russian (78.5%), followed by Tatars (14.5%), Chuvash (2.1%), and Ukrainians (1.0%).

References

Notes

Sources

Urban-type settlements in the Republic of Tatarstan
Populated places established in the 17th century
Sviyazhsky Uyezd